Felice Ficherelli (30 August 1605 – 5 March 1660) was an Italian painter of the Baroque period, born in San Gimignano and active mainly in Tuscany. Among Ficherelli's early patrons was Conte Bardi, who persuaded Ficherelli to move to Florence and to study with the painter Jacopo da Empoli. Empoli's influence is evident in the sumptuous fabrics seen in many of Ficherelli's works. Ficherelli was nicknamed "Felice Riposo" for his retiring nature.

There is a controversial copy of Ficherelli's Saint Praxedis, which appears to be signed by Johannes Vermeer and dated 1655.

Notes

References

External links
 The Death of Cleopatra

17th-century Italian painters
1605 births
1660 deaths
Painters from Siena
Italian male painters
Italian Baroque painters